The 2009 Youth Parapan American Games were a multi-sport event held from October 15 to October 23, 2009, in Bogota, Colombia. They were the second edition of the Youth Parapan American Games, and they were organized by the Colombian Paralympic Committee (CPC) and the International Paralympic Committee (IPC).

Organization

Venues
All of the game's events took place in Simón Bolívar Park. The opening ceremony took place in the  El Salitre Coliseum.

Mascot 

The mascot of the Bogota 2009 Youth Parapan American Games was an iguana. According to the organizing committee, "the iguana serves as a symbol for people with disabilities because they can supply their limitations, developing skills and aptitudes according to the environment in which they find themselves and taking their abilities beyond their limits. ... The iguana is part of our Parapanamerican culture."

The Games

Participating nations 

Source:

Sports

Calendar

Medals table 

Source: Coldeportes

References

External links
 

Sport in Bogotá
Multi-sport events in Colombia
Youth Parapan American Games
Parapan
Para